The Deportivo San Juan, commonly known as San Juan, was a Mexican football club based in Mazamitla. The club was founded in 2013.

Players

Current squad

References 

Association football clubs established in 2013
Defunct football clubs in Jalisco
Defunct football clubs in Mexico
2013 establishments in Mexico